"My Resistance Is Low" is a 1951 song by American singer, songwriter and band leader Hoagy Carmichael, with later lyrics by Harold Adamson.

Creation
Carmichael had the melody, and then recorded it backed by the Gordon Jenkins Chorus and Orchestra. Released on March 15, 1951, it did not feature in the Billboard chart.

The Las Vegas Story
The song is probably best known to American audiences for being in the closing sequence to the 1952 Jane Russell movie, The Las Vegas Story, which was produced and directed by Howard Hughes. Hughes cast Carmichael as Happy the piano player in a bar, and Carmichael agreed that Hughes could commission Harold Adamson to write suitable lyrics.

In its film review, Time Out'' magazine commented:

Re-released as a result, this time with the Adamson lyrics sung by Carmichael, released through Decca Records hit number one in the United Kingdom and a number of other countries.

Later releases
The song became a perennial classic in the UK, with most releases since Carmichael's within that country. The best known is 1976's (Clive) Robin Sarstedt's, who became a one-hit wonder when the track reached number 3 in the UK Singles Chart.

References

1951 songs
Songs with music by Hoagy Carmichael
The Shadows songs
Georgie Fame songs
Elvis Costello songs
Songs with lyrics by Harold Adamson